Iosif Davidovich Vitebskiy (born January 9, 1938, in Kiev) is a former Soviet Ukrainian Olympic medalist and world champion épée fencer, and current US fencing coach.

Early life 
Vitebskiy was born in Kiev, Ukrainian SSR, Soviet Union, and is Jewish. He attended Kiev State University, where he studied physical culture and sport.

Fencing career
During his fencing career, Vitebskiy trained at Dynamo in Kiev. He was a member of the Soviet Union and Ukrainian national teams, and won 19 medals in national championships (10 gold, 6 silver, and three bronze). He won several tournaments in Europe and the Soviet Union, and won in the team event at the World Fencing Championships in 1967, 1968, and 1969. He also won a silver medal in team épée at the 1968 Summer Olympics in Mexico City at the age of 30.

Vitebskiy won the Veteran 60 Men’s Épée category at the Summer US National Championships in Charlotte, North Carolina, in 1999.

Coaching 
He was head coach of the Ukraine Republic National Team for 13 years, and then served for 10 years (1988–98) as the Director of the school for high sport achievements at the State University of Ukraine. He served for a dozen years as an assistant coach at the University of Pennsylvania of the University of Pennsylvania Quakers fencing team.

Personal life
Vitebskiy and his wife, Emma have two sons, Dmitriy and Alex, and lived in Philadelphia.

See also
 List of select Jewish fencers

References

1938 births
Living people
Soviet male épée fencers
Ukrainian male épée fencers
Jewish Ukrainian sportspeople
Jewish male épée fencers
Olympic fencers of the Soviet Union
Fencers at the 1968 Summer Olympics
Olympic silver medalists for the Soviet Union
Olympic medalists in fencing
Dynamo sports society athletes
Sportspeople from Kyiv
Fencers from Philadelphia
Medalists at the 1968 Summer Olympics